Odontopera bilinearia is a moth of the family Geometridae first described by Charles Swinhoe in 1890. It is found in Asia, including Taiwan, China and Bhutan.

Subspecies
Odontopera bilinearia bilinearia
Odontopera bilinearia coryphodes (Wehrli, 1940)
Odontopera bilinearia nephela (Wehrli, 1940)
Odontopera bilinearia subarida Inoue, 1986 (Taiwan)

References

Moths described in 1890
Ennominae